Eeco or EECO may refer to

Early Eocene Climatic Optimum, a warm period 50 million years ago
Maruti Suzuki Eeco, an Indian microvan